Banjul, officially the City of Banjul, is the capital and fourth largest city of The Gambia. It is the centre of the eponymous administrative division which is home to an estimated 400,000 residents, making it The Gambia's largest and most densely populated metropolitan area. Banjul is on St Mary's Island (Banjul Island), where the Gambia River enters the Atlantic Ocean. The population of the city proper is 31,301, with the Greater Banjul Area, which includes the City of Banjul and the Kanifing Municipal Council, at a population of 413,397 (2013 census). The island is connected to the mainland to the west and the rest of Greater Banjul Area via bridges. There are also ferries linking Banjul to the mainland at the other side of the river.

From the 19th century until 24 April 1973, the city was known as Bathurst.

Etymology

Banjul takes its name from the Mandinka people who gathered specific fibres on the island, which were used in the manufacture of ropes. Bang julo is the Mandinka word for rope fibre.

History

In 1651 Banjul was leased by the Duke of Courland and Semigallia (German: Herzog von Kurland und Semgallen) from the King of Kombo, as part of the Couronian colonization.

On 23 April 1816, Tumani Bojang, the King of Kombo, ceded Banjul Island to Alexander Grant, the British commandant, in exchange for an annual fee of 103 iron bars. Grant's expedition, consisting of 75 men and tasked with establishing a military garrison, had been ordered by Charles MacCarthy. Grant founded Banjul as a trading post and base, constructing houses and barracks for controlling entrance to the Gambia estuary and suppressing the slave trade. The British renamed Banjul Island as St. Mary's Island and named the new town Bathurst, after the 3rd Earl Bathurst, Secretary of State for War and the Colonies at the time. Streets were laid out in a modified grid pattern, and named after Allied generals at the Battle of Waterloo. The town became the centre of British activity in the Gambia Colony and Protectorate.

Within a few years of its establishment the town started attracting migrants. Its population consisted of Africans of various origins, Levantines (Syrians, Lebanese) as well as Europeans (English, French, Portuguese). A majority of the population was Muslim but there was a significant Christian minority, including the Aku inhabitants. The majority of the Africans consisted of Wolof people, whose population rose from 829 in 1881 to 3,666 in 1901 and then 10,130 in 1944. They had mainly hailed from Gorée and Saint-Louis. The Mandinka were the second largest African group, followed by the Jola as well as the Fula. Islamic schools called dara were founded in Bathurst from its early years, resulting in the foundation of the first Muslim court in 1905, in addition to the increasingly more sophisticated British legal framework.

Bathurst was officially declared the capital of the Protectorate of the Gambia in 1889, leading to an increase in population. Through the 20th century, it became an even greater attraction for Gambians due to the availability of jobs fuelled by British colonial activities as well as social activities such as cinemas. Young men from rural farming villages would move to Bathurst to work at the Public Works Department (established in 1922) or docks. The town was an important Allied naval and air hub during World War II, resulting in an increase in population from 14,370 in 1931 to 21,154 in 1944.

After independence, the town's name was changed to Banjul in 1973. On 22 July 1994, Banjul was the scene of a bloodless military coup d'état in which President Dawda Jawara was overthrown and replaced by Yahya Jammeh. To commemorate this event, Arch 22 was built as an entrance portal to the capital. The gate is 35 metres tall and stands at the centre of an open square. It houses a textile museum.

Climate
Banjul features hot weather year round. Under the Köppen climate classification, Banjul features a tropical wet and dry climate (Aw). The city features a lengthy dry season, spanning from November to May and a relatively short wet season covering the remaining five months. However, during those five months, Banjul tends to see heavy rainfall. August is usually the rainiest month, with on average  of rainfall. Maximum temperatures are somewhat constant, though morning minima tend to be hotter during the wet season than the dry season.

According to a Gambian government minister, Banjul is at risk of submerging under water by a meter rise in sea levels as a result of climate change and global warming.

Climate change 
A 2019 paper published in PLOS One estimated that under Representative Concentration Pathway 4.5, a "moderate" scenario of climate change where global warming reaches ~ by 2100, the climate of Banjul in the year 2050 would most closely resemble the current climate of Bamako in Mali.

Districts

Banjul Division (Greater Banjul Area) is divided into two districts:
Banjul
Kanifing

Economy

Banjul is the country's economic and administrative centre and includes the Central Bank of the Gambia. Peanut processing is the country's principal industry, but beeswax, palm wood, palm oil, and skins and hides are also shipped from the port of Banjul.

Banjul is also the home of the Gambia Technical Training Institute. GTTI is engaged in a partnership with non-profit organization Power Up Gambia to develop a solar energy training program.

Transport

The primary method reaching the city by land is by roadway. A highway connects Banjul to Serrekunda which crosses the Denton Bridge, however ferries provide another mode of transportation. As of May 2014, ferries sail regularly from Banjul across the Gambia River to Barra. The city is served by the Banjul International Airport. Banjul is on the Trans–West African Coastal Highway connecting it to Dakar and Bissau, and will eventually provide a paved highway link to 11 other nations of the Economic Community of West African States (ECOWAS).

Culture 
Attractions in the city include the Gambian National Museum, the Albert Market, Banjul State House, Banjul Court House, African Heritage Museum.

Sport
Banjul is the destination of the Plymouth-Banjul Challenge, a charity road rally.

Education
The University of the Gambia was founded in 1999.

International schools
 Banjul American Embassy School
 École Française de Banjul in Bakau.
 Marina International School

Places of worship
Among the places of worship, they are predominantly Muslim mosques. There are also Christian churches and temples : Roman Catholic Diocese of Banjul (Catholic Church), Church of the Province of West Africa (Anglican Communion), Assemblies of God.

Notable people
 
 
Gambino Akuboy (born 1985), singer & songwriter, actor and screenwriter

See also
Divisions of the Gambia
Districts of the Gambia

Bibliography
 
 Matthew James Park, Heart of Banjul: The History of Banjul, The Gambia, 1816-1965. PhD dissertation, Michigan State University, 2016.

External links

A History of Banjul, PhD thesis

References

 
Local Government Areas of the Gambia
Populated places in the Gambia
Capitals in Africa
Serer country
Populated places established in 1816
Port cities and towns of the Atlantic Ocean
Port cities in Africa
Gambia River
Former colonies of Courland
1816 establishments in the British Empire
1816 establishments in Africa